McCrabb is a surname. Notable people with the surname include:

Austin McCrabb (born 1965), Australian rules footballer
Les McCrabb (1914–2008), American baseball player